Matt Reilly may refer to:

 Matthew Reilly (born 1974), Australian action thriller writer
 Matt Reilly (footballer) (1874–1954), Irish international goalkeeper